"Musicology" is a song by Prince, and title track from his 2004 album of the same name. The song is an obvious ode to James Brown's style of funk music popularized in the early 1970s. The song is also reminiscent of Prince's own "The Work, pt. 1", from his 2001 album The Rainbow Children.

The B-side of the single is the Musicology track "On the Couch", a seductive ballad with a gospel flavor. In addition, Prince released a song on his website titled "Magnificent", which was listed as the "virtual B-side" to "Musicology".

In the United States, the song received airplay on Urban Adult Contemporary radio stations. The song had larger success as a video with television airplay, as it was played regularly on MTV, BET, and VH1. Outside the US, the song had considerable success on the pop charts in a number of countries. Specifically, "Musicology" went Top 40 in Argentina, Australia, Italy, Netherlands, New Zealand, Norway, and Switzerland.

The song won the Grammy Award for Best Traditional R&B Performance at the 47th Annual Grammy Awards.

Charts

References

2004 singles
Music videos directed by Sanaa Hamri
Prince (musician) songs
Songs written by Prince (musician)
Grammy Award for Best Traditional R&B Vocal Performance
NPG Records singles
Song recordings produced by Prince (musician)
2004 songs